Qatar Gaz may refer to:
 Qatar Gaz, Kerman
 Qatar Gaz, Razavi Khorasan
 Qatar Gaz, South Khorasan